Edward Delaney or DeLaney may refer to:
Edward Delaney (1930–2009), Irish sculptor
Edward DeLaney, American politician elected 2009
Edward Leo Delaney (1885–1972), American broadcaster of Nazi propaganda during World War II
Edward J. Delaney (born 1957), American film-maker and journalist
Edward K. Delaney, Mayor of St Paul, Minnesota, USA 1948–1952